Scopula abolita is a moth of the family Geometridae. It was described by Claude Herbulot in 1956. It is endemic to Madagascar.

References

Moths described in 1956
abolita
Taxa named by Claude Herbulot
Moths of Africa